Enel Green Power S.p.A. is an Italian multinational renewable energy corporation, headquartered in Rome. 
The company was formed as a subsidiary of the power generation firm Enel in December 2008. It is present with assets in operation or under construction in 21 countries and carries out development activities in a further 5 countries on five continents generating energy from solar, geothermal, wind and hydropower sources. 

As of 2022, it manages a capacity of 56,3 GW (0,7 GW Storage) and has over 1200 plants worldwide. From 4 November 2010 to 31 March 2016, the company was listed on the FTSE MIB index of the Milan Stock Exchange, as well as on the Madrid Stock Exchange and the Barcelona, Bilbao, and Valencia regional Stock Exchanges.

History
Enel Green Power was founded on 1 December 2008 to concentrate all of Enel's activities in the production of renewable energy. At the time of its establishment, Enel was the largest European company in the field of renewable energy, both in terms of installed capacity and international presence. Following its foundation, the activities of the renewable energy branch were gradually transferred to Enel Green Power; these included activities conducted via Enel Produzione SpA in Italy and assets within the possession of Enel Investment Holding abroad, including Enel Latin America BV, Erelis Enel and Endesa.

2011-2012
Between 2011 and 2012, Enel Green Power expanded with wind power throughout the American continents. The first of a long series of wind-powered installations opened in the state of Bahia in Brazil, which generated approximately 30 MW managed by Cristal; this was followed by installations in the United States in Oklahoma (Rocky Ridge with 150 MW) and Kansas (Caney River with 200 MW). In 2012, the 85 MW Palo Viejo hydroelectric power plant was inaugurated in Guatemala.

2013-2015
Alongside with the latest business trends, between 2013 and 2015 a new business model based on sustainability was established in Enel Green Power. It is the “Creating Shared Value” (CSV) model, developed by Mark Porter and Mark Kramer in 2011. This model explains how sustainability becomes the guiding principle to be followed in every business choice, as well as the strategic approach to create, plan, manufacture and manage power plants. Each one of these individual steps is marked by a special attention towards environmental protection, a rational use of resources, the promotion of health and worksite safety, the circular economy, as well as creating new development opportunities for local communities. 
In 2014, the company was presented with a European Solar Prize by Eurosolar.

2016-today
After the launching of the 17 Sustainable Development Goals (SDGs) by the United Nations Assembly in 2016, Enel Green Power integrated the SDGs objectives into its industrial strategy, in particular those relating to quality of education (SDG 4), clean and economically accessible energy (SDG 7), dignity of work and economic growth (SDG 8), fight against climate change (SDG 13). The result was a series of projects developed together with the construction of power plants in South Africa, Ethiopia (100 MW Metehara), Australia (Bungala Solar), and South America, in particular in Peru (with the entry into operation of the Wayra I wind farm and the launch of the Rubì solar plant), in Guatemala (where the El Canadà hydroelectric power station is located), in Mexico (where the "cielito lindo" allows Enel Green Power to connect over 1 GW of photovoltaic power to the grid, in addition to the construction of the Amistad (220 MW), Amistad II (100 MW) and Salitrillos (103 MW) wind farms.

Mexico is also an example of the application of the "Build, Sell, Operate" model, which allows Enel to reduce debt and generate value, while maintaining the operational management of the plants.

In 2017, the company partnered with Anheuser-Busch to provide enough renewable energy from Enel's Oklahoma wind farm to meet Budweiser's needs for 15 years.

August 2020, the Board of Ada County Commissioners signed an agreement to sell the Barber Dam and Hydroelectric Project to Barber Pool Hydro LLC, a group of local investors with the goals of preserving the Barber Pool Conservation Area and producing clean and renewable energy for the community.

Operations

Enel Green Power generates electricity from renewable sources. It operates in five continents with more than 1,200 operative plants. The production mix includes geothermal energy, hydropower, solar energy, and wind power. Enel Green Power manages 56,3 GW of total renewable capacity.  The target is to reach 145 GW by 2030.

Enel Green Power has a total 17.18 GW of wind power capacity; hydroelectric capacity is 28.35 GW; geothermal power 0.92 GW; solar power 8.12 GW. Between 2020 and 2021, Enel Green Power has launched projects to develop green hydrogen, including an agreement with Eni to develop hydrogen production technology from renewable sources. Green hydrogen is expected to be generated by 2022-2023. In December 2020, Enel Green Power and NextChem have signed a memorandum of understanding to support the production of green hydrogen in the United States. The project, expected to be operational in 2023, will convert solar energy into green hydrogen to be supplied to a bio-refinery.

In Carlentini, Sicily, Enel Green Power is creating the Hydrogen Lab, an infrastructure to connect startups and global players, as well as to house experiments in the field of new technologies for green hydrogen in an industrial-scale environment. The initiative is part of the NEXTHY project, an innovation platform to accelerate the development of new technologies to produce, store and move green hydrogen on an industrial scale. The aim of the project is to make this sector competitive within the next 5 years.

Geothermal

Enel Green Power runs 35 geothermal power plants in Tuscany, with a total capacity of about 765,4 MW, that are able meet more than 30% of the regional consumption. Amongst those, the plant of Larderello, built in 1904, is one of the largest in the world. In the United States Enel Green Power operates five power plants, one of which is a solar-geothermal hybrid. Two of them are located in Churchill County, Nevada, and one is near Cove Fort, Utah.
In Chile Enel Green Power is finalizing the "Cerro Pabellón", the first geothermal power plant in South America. It is located at 4,500 meters above sea level.

Solar-geothermal hybrid

Enel Green Power has designed and built the first solar-geothermal hybrid plant, that combines the two sources of energy thus increasing the electricity production capacity. The first power plant of this kind, the Stillwater site, is located in Fallon, Nevada (USA), and has received $40 million in tax relief under the American Recovery and Reinvestment Act.

In the first half of 2014 work began to integrate a solar thermal power plant to the structure: today Stillwater has a current net capacity of 86,6 MW.

In the second half of 2014, Enel Green Power has partnered with the National Renewable Energy Laboratory (NREL) and the Idaho National Laboratory (INL), under the supervision of the US Department of Geothermal Technologies Office (GTO), via a cooperative research and development agreement, in order to use the data of the Stillwater plant to further develop the technology.

Solar thermal and concentrated solar power

The company also operates in the solar thermal and concentrated solar power (CSP), participating in research and development activities along with ENEA. Based on the studies of Nobel laureate Carlo Rubbia, in 2010 Enel Green Power built the Archimede combined cycle power plant in Priolo Gargallo in Sicily, with a total capacity of 5 MW. In the plant, parabolic mirrors focus the sun's heat on a fluid of molten salts that reaches temperatures of over 500 °C/932 °F and is able to retain heat for several hours, turning water into steam that then activates the traditional steam turbines system to produce electricity. The objective is to increase the efficiency of this type of plants so as to make them competitive compared to other sources.

Hydropower

Enel Green Power operates mainly in Europe and America. It manages a renewable capacity of around 17 GW in Europe and 10 GW in America.

Wind power

Enel Green Power's experience with wind power dates back to 1984, when Enel built the first Italian wind farm in Sardinia. In October 2008, in Kansas, US, the Smoky Hills Wind Farm, with a capacity of 250 MW, came into service, while in January 2008 in Snyder, Texas, Enel Green Power completed the installation of 21 wind turbines of 3 MW each.

In 2021, the 269MW Dolores wind farm began operations in Mexico with 83 Nordex turbines.

Wind-solar hybrid and cogeneration

In 2014, in Ollagüe, Chile, Enel Green Power began the construction of a mini hybrid solar-wind cogeneration plant for the production of both electricity and hot water, which runs independently from the national electricity system and is able to meet the average need of 150 families with an average capacity of 232 kW.

International presence

Europe

More than half of Enel Green Power's 1200 plants are located in Italy. The production mix includes hydropower, wind power, solar power, and geothermal power.

Enel Green Power has facilities in the Iberian Peninsula with 300 plants (hydropower, wind, and solar). This presence is the result of the integration of renewable energy activities of Enel and Endesa, as well as the construction and activation of new plants, including the Totana solar park (Fonte 2) and the Sierra Costera (Fonte 3) wind farm, which have been connected to the grid at the end of 2019. 

In Romania, Enel Green Power is present with 12 plants and a mix of wind and photovoltaic technology.

Enel Green Power is present in Greece with 60 power plants. It manages the Kafireas wind farm (7 wind parks), which was connected to the grid at the end of 2019.

North America

Enel Green Power is present in North America with plants operating and under construction in the United States (solar, wind and geothermal technology), Mexico and Canada (wind technology).

Latin America
In Latin America, Enel Green Power has operations in Mexico,  Panama, Guatemala, Costa Rica, Argentina, Brazil, Chile, Colombia and Peru, where it is present with all the main renewable production technologies, including wind, solar, hydroelectric and geothermal.

Africa
Enel Green Power is present in Africa with plants in operation and under construction in South Africa (solar and wind technology), Morocco (wind technology) and Zambia (solar technology).

Asia
In 2015 Enel Green Power acquired a majority stake in Indian renewable energy company BLP Energy – for 30 million euros. In Asia, Enel Green generates energy from wind and solar sources. It currently holds 100% of BLP Energy.

In India, Enel Green Power has established offices in Gurgaon and Bangalore and manages three wind farms:

 “Vayu” wind farm in the Kutch region of Gujarat;
 “Coral” wind farm in the Kutch region of Gujarat;
 “Amberi and Jath” wind farms in the Satara and Sangli regions of Maharashtra.

The company has also won two tenders for the “Tunga” Wind Project in Karnataka and for the “Thar” Solar Photovoltaic Project in Rajasthan.

Since 2021, Enel Green Power has expanded its presence to Vietnam with several renewable energy projects. The first plant is set to begin operations in 2024.

Oceania
Enel Green Power is present in Oceania with 3 solar parks.

Governance

CEOs
 Francesco Starace(September 17, 2008 - May 29, 2014)
 Francesco Venturini (May 30, 2014 - April 27, 2017)
 Antonio Cammisecra (April 28, 2017 - September 30, 2020)
 Salvatore Bernabei (from 1 October 2020).

Power Purchase Agreement

The core business of Enel Green Power consists of the sale of renewable energy generated by its plants to commercial and industrial customers. In order to do this, Enel Green Power uses power purchase agreements (PPAs), namely long-term energy supply agreements through which it develops projects for companies.

Controversies

Turbine failure 
On 3 February 2015, a turbine at the hydropower plant at Barber Dam, Boise, Idaho, turned off. A regional operations manager for Enel said it was not clear what caused the shut down, and that an alert system also failed. Idaho Fish and Game said they did find some dead fish, and although they believed adult fish weren't impacted, younger ones could have been.

Lawsuits 
On 11 November 2014, the United States Attorney for the Northern District of Oklahoma filed suit against Enel's subsidiary Osage Wind LLC, an 84-turbine industrial wind project in Osage County, Okla. In the suit, the United States alleges that Enel and Osage Wind are illegally converting minerals owned by the Osage Nation, a Native American tribe that has owned all mineral rights in the county since 1871. The suit says that Osage Wind should have obtained a permit from the Bureau of Indian Affairs before mining rock and other material for the pits in which turbine bases are built. The United States asked that all excavating on the  site cease and that dozens of turbines that are already being erected be removed. Osage Wind has insisted that it is not mining and needs no permit. The company says that it has already spent nearly $300 million on the project, which is being built on privately owned fee land, not land held in trust for American Indians.  In 2015, the 10th U.S. Circuit Court of Appeals rules that construction of the turbines deprived the tribe of its property rights. In 2019, The U.S. Supreme Court declined to consider an appeal of this decision.

Osage Wind LLC and a second and adjacent Enel wind project, Mustang Run, were also embroiled in cases before the Oklahoma Supreme Court in which the Osage Nation and Osage County, Oklahoma,  challenged the constitutional legitimacy of permits for both projects. In 2016, Court found in Osage Wind LLC's favor.

References

External links

Renewable energy companies of Italy
Wind power companies of Europe
Enel
Energy companies established in 2008
Renewable resource companies established in 2008
Companies listed on the Madrid Stock Exchange
Italian companies established in 2008